War in the Garden of Eden is a book written by Kermit Roosevelt in 1919 which recounts his experiences during World War I in Mesopotamia (Modern-day Iraq).

External links 

 Project Gutenberg War in the Garden of Eden
 Global Grey War in the Garden of Eden in PDF, epub and Kindle formats
History books about World War I